The Allegory of Isabella d'Este's Coronation  is a painting by the Italian Renaissance painter Lorenzo Costa the Elder, dating to about 1505–1506.  It is displayed in the Louvre Museum of Paris, France.

History
The painting was the fourth commissioned by Isabella d'Este for her studiolo, after two canvasses by Andrea Mantegna (Parnassus and the Triumph of the Virtues, respectively from 1497 and 1499-1502) and Perugino's Combat of Love and Chastity (1503). 

The subject was provided by the court poet Paride of Ceresara and was initially assigned to Mantegna. However, after the latter's death in 1506, he was replaced by Lorenzo Costa, who deleted all the work made by his predecessor. Isabella liked the painting, and this granted Costa the position as the new court painter of the Gonzaga of Mantua.

Duke Charles I of Nevers gifted this and the other paintings in the studiolo to Cardinal Richelieu, and the Allegory thus went to Paris. After belonging to several collections, it became part of the collections of the Louvre Museum.

Description
The most accepted interpretation of the painting is an exaltation of Isabella d'Este, her rule and her role as patron of the arts, which generates harmony. She would be the figure in the center, crowned with laurel by Anteros, who is held by his mother, Venus: the two mythological figures would symbolize the heavenly and virtuous love, compared to the earthly and carnal one.

The scene would be in the garden of Harmony, where it is possible to freely practice Music, Arts and Poetry, which are referred to by the characters surrounding the coronation.  In the foreground, behind the garden's boundaries, are Diana, symbol of chastity, and Cadmus (on the left), protectors of the arts such as Mercury, identified by the scene of battle behind him on the painting's left. The two female characters sitting on the ground are identifiable with the Virtues who watch over Isabella's world: the one crowning the ox would be Perseverance, the one crowning the lamb would be Purity or  Innocence.

Another interpretation is that based on the Tabula Cebetis: the painting would represent the different genres of poetry, the foremost of which is lyrics, portrayed by Venus in the center. The character being crowned would be Sappho, and the personifications around her would be outstanding early lyricists such as Callimachus, Propertius, Ovid and Tibullus.

Other paintings of Isabella's Studiolo
 Parnassus by Mantegna
 Reign of Comus by Lorenzo Costa
 Triumph of the Virtues by Mantegna
 Combat of Love and Chastity by Pietro Perugino

Sources

External links
Page at the museum's website

1500s paintings
Paintings in the Louvre by Italian artists
Paintings by Lorenzo Costa the Elder
16th-century allegorical paintings
Allegorical paintings by Italian artists
Paintings of Venus
Gonzaga art collection
Sheep in art
Horses in art
Musical instruments in art
Ships in art
Cattle in art
Paintings depicting Diana (mythology)